Jonathan Andrew Kaye (born August 2, 1970) is an American professional golfer who played on the PGA Tour.

Biography
Kaye was born in Denver, Colorado, and is Jewish. He attended Sunnyslope High School in Phoenix, Arizona, where he was a star in golf, graduating in 1988. He graduated from the University of Colorado in 1993 and turned pro that same year. He began playing on the PGA Tour in 1995 after successfully competing in qualifying school.

Kaye has won twice on the PGA Tour, at the 2003 Buick Classic and the 2004 FBR Open, and he has over 30 top-10 finishes. He is a self-taught player who has never had a teacher. "There's nobody who could teach my swing," he has said.

Kaye has featured in the top 20 of the Official World Golf Ranking, though he has not played a PGA Tour event since 2011. Kaye briefly reappeared on the Web.com Tour in 2014, playing in three events and making the cut once with a T65 at the Panama Claro Championship. He also played on the Web.com Tour in 2017. In July 2017, 21 years after winning his first Colorado Open, he won it again with a record-tying 23-under-par 265 in the 53rd CoBank Colorado Open, earning $100,000.

2001 incident
Kaye was the co-leader at the 2001 Michelob Championship at Kingsmill after the second round. As he was heading to the locker room, a security guard refused him entry without his player ID badge, which Kaye then found and clipped provocatively to his belt buckle or the zipper of his pants. The guard took offense, and PGA Tour commissioner Tim Finchem reportedly suspended Kaye for two months (but the PGA Tour never divulges or even acknowledges player suspensions).

Professional wins (4)

PGA Tour wins (2)

PGA Tour playoff record (1–1)

Other wins (2)
1996 Colorado Open
2017 Colorado Open

Results in major championships

CUT = missed the half-way cut
DQ = disqualified
"T" = tied

Results in The Players Championship

CUT = missed the halfway cut
"T" indicates a tie for a place

Results in World Golf Championships

1Cancelled due to 9/11

QF, R16, R32, R64 = Round in which player lost in match play
"T" = Tied
NT = No tournament

See also
1994 PGA Tour Qualifying School graduates
1998 PGA Tour Qualifying School graduates
2006 PGA Tour Qualifying School graduates
List of Jewish golfers

References

External links

American male golfers
Colorado Buffaloes men's golfers
PGA Tour golfers
Jewish golfers
Golfers from Denver
Golfers from Phoenix, Arizona
Jewish American sportspeople
1970 births
Living people
21st-century American Jews